Khawaja Saad Rafique  (born 4 November 1962) is a Pakistani politician who has been a member of the National Assembly of Pakistan since October 2018 and the current federal minister for Railways.

A leader of the Pakistan Muslim League (Nawaz), Rafique previously served as the Minister for Railways in Abbasi cabinet from August 2017 to May 2018 and in the Sharif's third ministry from 2013 to 2017 and held the cabinet portfolio of Minister for Culture and the Minister for Youth Affairs briefly during the Gillani ministry in 2008.

Rafique had been a member of the National Assembly of Pakistan from 2002 to May 2018 and served as Special Assistant to Prime Minister for Youth Affairs from 1997 to 1999 under Sharif's second ministry.

Early life and education
Rafique was born on 4 November 1962 in Lahore, Pakistan to Begum Farhat Rafique and Khawaja Mohammad Rafiq. His father migrated from Kashmir  to Amritsar  and then to Lahore and was a small-time businessman in Lahore who was murdered in the early 1970s. The family blamed the crime on Zulfikar Ali Bhutto.

Rafique enrolled at the M.A.O. College and made a transfer to Punjab University in 1982. He graduated with a BA in Political science in 1984, and later attained MA in Political science in 1986.

Political career

Rafique started his political career as a student leader representing Muslim Student Federation, from MAO College Lahore in early 1980s, and later on joined the PML-N.

In 1997 Pakistani general elections, Rafique participated in the elections on the PML-N's ticket and was elected as the member of Provincial Assembly of the Punjab for the first time. He was appointed Special Assistant to Prime Minister for Youth Affairs by then Prime Minister of Pakistan Nawaz Sharif, but his tenure was terminated by General Pervez Musharraf after the latter's 1999 Pakistani coup d'état. He was among the PML-N leaders who confronted Musharraf in the absence of Nawaz Sharif.

In 2002 Pakistani general elections, Rafique was elected as member of National Assembly from Constituency NA-119 for the first time. During the period, he served as president of PML-N Punjab.

In 2008 Pakistani general elections, Rafique was re-elected as the member of the National Assembly for the second time from Constituency NA-125. He was appointed the Minister for Culture and Minister for Youth Affairs in the Gillani ministry but he resigned after PML-N's went on to lead the Lawyer's movement to restore the judiciary.

He was eventually arrested and imprisoned after calling for Musharraf's removal. He, along with party colleagues and lawyers, took to the streets calling for the resignation of Musharraf and the reinstatement of judges deposed by him. He was also put behind bars for partaking in violent protests for the said purpose. Among PML-N's leaders, Rafique was one of the activists who kept the PML-N alive during the Musharraf government.

In 2013 Pakistani general election, Rafique was re-elected as the member of the National Assembly for the third time. His wife, Ghazala Saad, was also allotted PML-N's ticket. In June 2013, Rafique was appointed Minister of Railways by the Prime Minister Nawaz Sharif and took oath on 8 June 2013.

He had ceased to hold ministerial office in July 2017 when the federal cabinet was disbanded following the resignation of Prime Minister Nawaz Sharif after Panama Papers case decision. Following the election of Shahid Khaqan Abbasi as Prime Minister of Pakistan, Rafique was inducted into the federal cabinet of Abbasi and was appointed Minister for Railways for the second time. Upon the dissolution of the National Assembly on the expiration of its term on 31 May 2018, Rafique ceased to hold the office as Federal Minister for Railways.

He was re-elected to Provincial Assembly of the Punjab as a candidate of PML-N from Constituency PP-168 (Lahore-XXV) in 2018 Pakistani general election. Rafique also ran for the seat of national assembly from Constituency NA-131 (Lahore-IX) but was unsuccessful as he was defeated by Prime minister Imran Khan along with 4 other seats from which he won in general election of 2018.

He was re-elected to the National Assembly as a candidate of PML-N from Constituency NA-131 (Lahore-IX) in by-election held on 14 October 2018 after Imran Khan resigned from this seat and kept his home-city seat of Mianwali.

Family
He has married twice. His first wife Ghazala Saad Rafique has been a member of Provincial Assembly of the Punjab. He has two daughters and one son from his first wife. His brother Khawaja Salman Rafique has been a member of Provincial Assembly of the Punjab and was Provincial Minister of Punjab for Health.

In April 2017, it was reported that Rafique has secretly married a PTV host Shafaq Hira, without the consent of his first wife, Ghazala. In June 2018, Rafique disclosed his second marriage to Shafaq Hira in his nomination papers for 2018 general election.

References

|-

|-

1962 births
Living people
Punjabi people
Pakistani prisoners and detainees
Pakistani people of Kashmiri descent
Punjab MPAs 1997–1999
Pakistani MNAs 2002–2007
Pakistani MNAs 2008–2013
Pakistani MNAs 2013–2018
Pakistan Muslim League (N) MPAs (Punjab)
Pakistan Muslim League (N) MNAs
University of the Punjab alumni
Politicians from Lahore
Government ministers of Pakistan
Punjab MPAs 2018–2023
Central Model School, Lahore alumni
Minister of Railways (Pakistan)